Dukuh Atas MRT Station (or Dukuh Atas BNI MRT Station, with BNI granted for naming rights) is a rapid transit station on the North-South Line of the Jakarta MRT. Located at Menteng, Menteng, Central Jakarta. The station is also a transit point for other types of public transportation as part of Dukuh Atas TOD.

History 

Station layout

Gallery

References

External links
 
  

central Jakarta
Jakarta MRT stations
railway stations opened in 2019